Evelyn Mary Rawlins (1889–1977) was a New Zealand music teacher and community leader. She was born in Palmerston North, Manawatu, New Zealand in 1889.

References

1889 births
1977 deaths
New Zealand music teachers
New Zealand educators